The Graphophone was the name and trademark of an improved version of the phonograph. It was invented at the Volta Laboratory established by Alexander Graham Bell in Washington, D.C., United States.

Its trademark usage was acquired successively by the Volta Graphophone Company, then the American Graphophone Company, the North American Phonograph Company, and finally by the Columbia Phonograph Company (known today as Columbia Records), all of which either produced or sold Graphophones.

Research and development 

It took five years of research under the directorship of Benjamin Hulme, Harvey Christmas, Charles Sumner Tainter and Chichester Bell at the Volta Laboratory to develop and distinguish their machine from Thomas Edison's Phonograph.

Among their innovations, the researchers experimented with lateral recording techniques as early as 1881. Contrary to the vertically-cut grooves of Edison Phonographs, the lateral recording method used a cutting stylus that moved from side to side in a "zig zag" pattern across the record. While cylinder phonographs never employed the lateral cutting process commercially, this later became the primary method of phonograph disc recording.

Bell and Tainter also developed wax-coated cardboard cylinders for their record cylinder. Edison's grooved mandrel covered with a removable sheet of tinfoil (the actual recording medium) was prone to damage during installation or removal. Tainter received a separate patent for a tube assembly machine to automatically produce the coiled cardboard tube cores of the wax cylinder records. The shift from tinfoil to wax resulted in increased sound fidelity and record longevity.

Besides being far easier to handle, the wax recording medium also allowed for lengthier recordings and created superior playback quality.  Additionally the Graphophones initially deployed foot treadles to rotate the recordings, then wind-up clockwork drive mechanisms, and finally migrated to electric motors, instead of the manual crank on Edison's Phonograph.

Commercialization 

In 1885, when the Volta Laboratory Associates were sure that they had a number of practical inventions, they filed patent applications and began to seek out investors. The Volta Graphophone Company of Alexandria, Virginia, was created on January 6, 1886, and incorporated on February 3, 1886. It formed to control the patents and to handle the commercial development of their sound recording and reproduction inventions, one of which became the first Dictaphone.

After the Volta Associates gave several demonstrations in Washington, D.C., businessmen from Philadelphia created the American Graphophone Company on March 28, 1887, to produce and sell the machines for the budding phonograph marketplace. The Volta Graphophone Company then merged with American Graphophone, which itself later evolved into Columbia Records.  The Howe Machine Factory (for sewing machines) in Bridgeport, Connecticut, became American Graphophone manufacturing plant. Tainter resided there for several months to supervise manufacturing before becoming ill, but later went on to continue his inventive work for many years. The small Bridgeport plant, which initially produced three or four machines a day, later became the Dictaphone Corporation.

Subsequent developments 
Shortly after American Graphophone creation, Jesse H. Lippincott used nearly $1 million of an inheritance to gain control of it, as well as the rights to the Graphophone and the Bell and Tainter patents. He directly invested $200,000 into American Graphophone, and agreed to purchase 5,000 machines yearly, in return for sales rights to the Graphophone (except in Virginia, Delaware, and the District of Columbia).

Soon after, Lippincott purchased the Edison Speaking Phonograph Company and its patents for US$500,000, and exclusive sales rights of the Phonograph in the United States from Ezrah T. Gilliand (who had previously been granted the contract by Edison) for $250,000, leaving Edison with the manufacturing rights.
. He then created the North American Phonograph Company in 1888 to consolidate the national sales rights of both the Graphophone and the Edison Speaking Phonograph.

Jesse Lippincott set up a sales network of local companies to lease Phonographs and Graphophones as dictation machines. In the early 1890s Lippincott fell victim to the unit's mechanical problems and also to resistance from stenographers, resulting in the company's bankruptcy. 

A coin-operated version of the Graphophone, was developed by Tainter in 1893 to compete with nickel-in-the-slot entertainment phonograph  demonstrated in 1889 by Louis T. Glass, manager of the Pacific Phonograph Company.

In 1889, the trade name Graphophone began to be utilized by Columbia Phonograph Company as the name for their version of the Phonograph. Columbia Phonograph Company, originally established  by a group of entrepreneurs licensed by the American Graphophone Company to retail graphophones in Washington DC, ultimately acquired  American Graphophone Company in 1893. In 1904, Columbia Phonograph Company established itself in Toronto, Canada. Two years later, in 1906, the American Graphophone company reorganized and changed its name to Columbia Graphophone Company to reflect its association with Columbia. In 1918, Columbia Graphophone Company reorganized to form a retailer, Columbia Graphophone Company—and a manufacturer, Columbia Graphophone Manufacturing Company. In 1923, Louis Sterling bought Columbia Phonograph Co. and reorganized it yet again, giving birth to the future record giant Columbia Records.

Early machines compatible with Edison cylinders were modified treadle machines. The upper-works connected to a spring or electric motor  (called Type K electric) in a boxy case, which could record and play back the old Bell and Tainter cylinders.  Some models, like the Type G, had new upper-works that were not designed to play Bell and Tainter cylinders.  The name Graphophone was used by Columbia (for disc machines) into the 1920s or 1930s, and the similar name Grafonola was used to denote internal horn machines.

See also 
 Columbia Graphophone Company, one of the earliest gramophone companies in the United Kingdom
 Howe Machine Factory
 List of phonograph manufacturers
 Volta Laboratory and Bureau
 Charles A. Cheever

References 

 This article incorporates text from the United States National Museum, a government publication in the public domain.

External links 
 Charles Tainter and the Graphophone
 The Development of Sound Recording at the Volta Laboratory, Raymond R. Wile, Association for Recorded Sound Collections Journal, 21:2, Fall 1990, retrieved July 2, 2017 
 Type K Electric Graphophone
 Identification guides for Columbia Graphophones:
 Cylinder Graphophones
 Front-mount Graphophones
 Rear-mount Graphophones

Audiovisual introductions in 1886
Audio players
Audio equipment manufacturers of the United States
Alexander Graham Bell
Phonograph manufacturers
History of Bridgeport, Connecticut
Georgetown (Washington, D.C.)
American inventions
Articles containing video clips